Păpăuți is a village in Rezina District, Moldova.

Natives
Filimon Săteanu, poet

References

Villages of Rezina District